David Michael O'Connell  (born April 21, 1955) is an American prelate of the Roman Catholic Church, serving as the bishop of the Diocese of Trenton in New Jersey since 2010. He is a member of the Congregation of the Mission and a past president of the Catholic University of America.

Biography

Early life and education
David O'Connell was born on April 21, 1955, in Philadelphia, one of the four sons of Arthur J. and June O'Connell. He was raised in nearby Langhorne, Pennsylvania. Feeling drawn at an early age to the Catholic priesthood, he attended the Vincentian minor seminary, St. Joseph Preparatory High School, in Princeton, New Jersey.  He received a Bachelor of Philosophy degree from Niagara University in Lewiston, New York, in 1978. He then studied at Mary Immaculate Seminary in Northampton, Pennsylvania, where he earned a Master of Divinity degree (1981) and a Master of Theology degree in moral theology (1983).

Ordination and ministry
O'Connell was ordained a priest of the Congregation of the Mission by Joseph McShea on May 29, 1982, in the chapel of the seminary. His first assignment was as a teacher at Archbishop Wood Catholic High School in Warminster, Pennsylvania, where he also served as director of student activities from 1983 to 1985. He continued his studies at The Catholic University of America School of Canon Law in Washington, DC, receiving a Licentiate of Canon Law in 1987. From 1987 to 1990, O'Connell was registrar and an assistant professor of canon law, theology, and philosophy at Mary Immaculate Seminary. He earned a Doctor of Canon Law degree from the Catholic University in 1990. He also served as an ecclesiastical judge and canonical consultant for:

 Diocese of Harrisburg (1987–1998) 
 Diocese of Birmingham (1987–1993)
 Diocese of Scranton (1988–1998)

Between 1990 and 1998, O'Connell served at St. John's University in New York City in various capacities. He was associate dean (1990–1991) before serving as professor of theology and religious studies, academic dean, and dean of faculty (1991–1998). O'Connell was also associate vice president from 1995 to 1998, and assistant legal counsel from 1996 to 1998. From 1994 to 1998, he served as acting vice president and dean of Niagara University.

Presidency of the Catholic University of America

O'Connell was the 14th president of Catholic University of America (CUA) from 1998 until 2010. He also became a consultor to the Vatican Congregation for Catholic Education in 2005 and was appointed as John Joseph Keane University Professor of the university in 2006.

According to the CUA, "He has been a nationally recognized spokesperson for and supporter of Ex Corde Ecclesiae and its full implementation within the Catholic academy." Under O'Connell's tenure, CUA remained under censure by the American Association of University Professors, and O'Connell did not seek to remove this sanction.

In 1998, the Vatican ordered senior church members in the United States to address new requirements for higher education.  The Vatican also required some educators to take an oath of fidelity to these teachings. Although many opposed the oath, O'Connell took the oath on the final day of the conference.

On October 2, 2009, O'Connell announced that he was stepping down as president of Catholic University in August 2010. On June 4, 2010, Pope Benedict XVI named him coadjutor bishop of the Diocese of Trenton.

Coadjutor Bishop and Bishop of Trenton
On June 4, 2010, O'Connell was appointed coadjutor bishop of the Diocese of Trenton by Pope Benedict XVI. O'Connell received his episcopal consecration on July 30, 2010, from Bishop John M. Smith, with Archbishops John J. Myers and Donald Wuerl serving as co-consecrators, at the Cathedral of St. Mary of the Assumption in Trenton. O'Connell chose as his episcopal motto: Ministrare non ministrari, meaning, "To serve and not to be served".

As coadjutor bishop, O'Connell automatically succeeded Bishop Smith on December 1, 2010, when Benedict XVI accepted Smith's resignation.

Transparency
In August 2012, O'Connell was given records showing that a priest of his diocese, Matthew Riedlinger, had exchanged sexually explicit text messages with and tried to set up a meeting with a person he believed to be a 16-year-old boy. O'Connell removed Riedlinger from the parish where he was serving, but did not inform parishioners of the reason for his removal until a year later, when he was informed that The Star-Ledger would be publishing a story on the matter.

See also

 Catholic Church hierarchy
 Catholic Church in the United States
 Historical list of the Catholic bishops of the United States
 List of Catholic bishops of the United States
 Lists of patriarchs, archbishops, and bishops

References

External links
Bishop of Trenton Bio
Catholic Diocese of Trenton Website

 

1955 births
Living people
Clergy from Philadelphia
Vincentians
Niagara University alumni
Mary Immaculate Seminary alumni
Catholic University of America alumni
Canonical theologians
St. John's University (New York City) faculty
Mary Immaculate Seminary faculty
Catholic University of America faculty
Presidents of the Catholic University of America
21st-century Roman Catholic bishops in the United States
Roman Catholic bishops of Trenton
Vincentian bishops
Catholic University of America School of Canon Law alumni